Rowsley is a village on the A6 road in the English county of Derbyshire. The population as at the 2011 census was 507.

It is at the point where the River Wye flows into the River Derwent and prospered from mills on both. The border of the Peak District National Park runs through the village west of the River Wye and immediately to the north of Chatsworth Road. The Peak District Boundary Walk goes through the village.

Overview

Notable features are the bridge over the River Derwent, St Katherine's Church, Rowsley and the Grade-II*-listed Peacock hotel, originally built in 1652 as a manor house by John Stevenson, agent to Lady Manners, whose family crest bearing a peacock gives it its name. Both Longfellow and Landseer are said to have stayed there. Nearby is Chatsworth House, home of the Duke and Duchess of Devonshire.

It was the site of an extensive motive power depot and marshalling yard, the first being built by the Manchester, Buxton, Matlock and Midlands Junction Railway with a railway station designed by Joseph Paxton in 1849. This was replaced by a new station when the line was extended  northwards in 1862. It was frequently used by King Edward VII when he visited Chatsworth House. The original station became a goods depot until 1968, when it was used as a contractor's yard. It then became the centrepiece of a shopping development known as Peak Village.

Railway stations

Rowsley South
Rowsley South is the current northern terminus of the preserved heritage railway Peak Rail, and is located about a quarter-mile south of the village itself. Running for a length of four miles between Rowsley and Matlock, it is projected that the heritage railway will run into Rowsley proper in the near future. In the long term, the A6 presents the greatest challenge to the organisation, as a new bridge is required to be built over it in order to reach the viaduct which crosses the River Derwent and thence the trackbed that runs through the Duke of Rutland's estate to Bakewell.

Rowsley North

Notable residents
Phillip Whitehead, MP, MEP, author and Emmy Award-winning television producer, was brought up here.

See also
Listed buildings in Rowsley

References

Further reading
 The Peacock at Rowsley. (1869). A gossiping book about fishing and country life with a descriptive of a well-known resort of anglers at the junction of the Wye and River Derwent, by John Joseph Briggs, London: Bemrose and Sons

External links

 "Picture the Past" Rowsley station building in 1987

Villages in Derbyshire
Towns and villages of the Peak District
Derbyshire Dales